Niphonatossa mussardi is a species of beetle in the family Cerambycidae, and the only species in the genus Niphonatossa. It was described by Stephan von Breuning in 1967.

References

Pteropliini
Beetles described in 1967